Razlan Joffri bin Ali (born 6 January 1985) is a Malaysian professional football referee.

Razlan is a former football player who played as a right back for Sime Darby in 2011 and PKNS.

Career
On 4 November 2017, Razlan was selected as a referee for the 2017 Malaysia Cup Final in Shah Alam Stadium, Shah Alam, between Kedah and Johor Darul Ta'zim.

References

External links
 

Malaysian football referees
Living people
1985 births